Advertising research is a systematic process of marketing research conducted to improve the efficiency of advertising. Advertising research is a detailed study conducted to know how customers respond to a particular ad or advertising campaign.

History
The highlighted events of the history of advertising research include:

1879 - N. W. Ayer conducts custom research in an attempt to win the advertising business of Nichols-Shepard Co., a manufacturer of agricultural machinery.

1895 - Harlow Gale of the University of Minnesota mails questionnaires to gather opinions about advertising from the public.

1900s - George B. Waldron conducts qualitative research for Mahin’s Advertising Agency.

1910s - 1911 can be considered the year marketing research becomes an industry. That year, J. George Frederick leaves his position as editor of Printer’s Ink to begin his research company, the Business Bourse with clients such as General Electric and the Texas Co. Also in 1911, Kellogg's ad manager, R. O. Eastman creates the Association of National Advertisers which is now known as the Association of National Advertising Managers. The group’s first project is a postcard questionnaire to determine magazine readership. The results introduce the concept of duplication of circulation. In 1916, R. O. Eastman starts his own company, the Eastman Research Bureau which boasts clients such as Cosmopolitan, Christian Herald, and General Electric.

1920s - In 1922, Dr. Daniel Starch tests reader recognition levels of magazine and newspaper advertisements and editorial content. In 1923, Dr. George Gallup begins measuring advertising readership.

1930s - In 1936, Dr. George Gallup validates his survey methodology by using the same tools polling voters during public elections. This allows him to successfully compare and validate his study's results against the election’s results.

1940s - Post World War II, the U.S. sees a large increase in the number of market research companies.

1950s - Market researchers focus on improving methods and measures. In their search for a single-number statistic to capture the overall performance of the advertising creative, Day-After-Recall (DAR) is created.

1960s - Qualitative focus groups gain in popularity. In addition, some advertisers call for more rigorous measurement of the in-market effectiveness of advertising in order to provide better accountability for the large amounts being spent on advertising. In response, Seymour Smith and Associates, using Advertising Research Foundation data as a jumping-off point, develops the Communicus System, a comprehensive approach to isolating the in-market impact of advertising across media.

1970s - Computers emerge as business tools, allowing researchers to conduct large-scale data manipulations. (Honomichl p. 175) Multiple studies prove DAR (Recall) scores do not predict sales. The measure, persuasion, also known as motivation, is validated as a predictor of sales.  The measure known as “breakthrough” is re-examined by researchers who make a distinction between the attention-getting power of the creative execution (attention) and how well “branded” the ad is (brand linkage). Herbert Krugman seeks to measure non-verbal measures biologically by tracking brain wave activities as respondents watch commercials. (Krugman) Others experiment with galvanic skin response, voice pitch analysis, and eye-tracking.

1980s - Researchers begin to view commercials as a “structured flow of experience” rather than a single unit to be rated on the whole, creating moment-by-moment systems  such as the dial-a-meter.

1990s - Ameritest Research creates Picture Sorts to provide accurate non-verbal measurements in a moment-by-moment system. Picture Sorts results are graphed to visually represent commercial viewers' moment-by-moment image recognition (Flow of Attention), positive and negative feelings (Flow of Emotion), and brand values (Flow of Meaning).  Trends in in-market tracking include a greater focus on the multimedia nature of entire advertising campaigns.

2000s -   Global advertisers seek an integrated marketing research system that will work worldwide so they can compare results across countries. For a look at trends predicted for advertising research in the 21st century, see Seven Trends for the Future.  Dr. Robert Heath publishes the seminal and controversial monograph “The Hidden Power of Advertising” which challenged the traditional models used in advertising research and shows how most advertising is processed at an emotional level (not a rational level).  His monograph leads to re-examination of in-market research approaches that compare the behaviors of those who have seen advertising versus those who have not, such as the Communicus System, and the development of brand new pretesting systems such as the OTX AdCEP system.

Types
There are two types of research, customized and syndicated. Customized research is conducted for a specific client to address that client’s needs. Only that client has access to the results of the research. Syndicated research is a single research study conducted by a research company with its results available, for sale, to multiple companies.
Pre-market research can be conducted to optimize advertisements for any medium: radio, television, print (magazine, newspaper or direct mail), outdoor billboard (highway, bus, or train), or Internet. Different methods would be applied to gather the necessary data appropriately.
Post-testing is conducted after the advertising, either a single ad or an entire multimedia campaign has been run in-market. The focus is on what the advertising has done for the brand, for example increasing brand awareness, trial, frequency of purchasing.

Pre-testing
Pre-testing, also known as copy testing, is a specialized field of marketing research that determines an ad’s effectiveness based on consumer responses, feedback, and behavior.
Pre-testing is conducted before implementing the advertisement to customers. The following methods can be followed to pre-test an advertisement:
 Focus group discussion
 In-depth interview
 Projective techniques
 Checklist method
 Consumer jury method
 Sales area test
 Questionnaire method
 Recall test
 Readability test
 Eye movement test

Campaign pre-testing
A new area of pre-testing driven by the realization that what works on TV does not necessarily translate in other media.  Greater budgets allocated to digital media in particular have driven the need for campaign pre-testing. The addition of a media planning tool to this testing approach allows advertisers to test the whole campaign, creative and media, and measures the synergies expected with an integrated campaign.

Post-testing
Post-testing/Tracking studies provide either periodic or continuous in-market research monitoring a brand’s performance, including brand awareness, brand preference, product usage and attitudes. Some post-testing approaches simply track changes over time, while others use various methods to quantify the specific changes produced by advertising—either the campaign as a whole or by the different media utilized.

Overall, advertisers use post-testing to plan future advertising campaigns, so the approaches that provide the most detailed information on the accomplishments of the campaign are most valued. The two types of campaign post-testing that have achieved the greatest use among major advertisers include continuous tracking, in which changes in advertising spending are correlated with changes in brand awareness, and longitudinal studies, in which the same group of respondents are tracked over time. With the longitudinal approach, it is possible to go beyond brand awareness, and to isolate the campaign's impact on specific behavioral and perceptual dimensions, and to isolate campaign impact by media.

Attention
In advertising research, attention is the qualitative measure of an advertisement's effectiveness in arousing interest in a viewer. Qualitative is a measurement that is based on peoples emotions and opinions of the advertisement.

Focus Group based methodologies can be used to collect qualitative responses which inform a measure of attention to an advertisement in a simulated environment. One example of this is a "dummy advertising vehicle test," in which a test Television Advertisement is shown with control ads in a controlled environment designed to simulate a commercial break on television. The test ad is embedded alongside either directly competitive advertising, or ads from non-competing product categories, depending on the advertiser's preference. Respondents are asked the question "Which of these ads did you find interesting?" If the test ad is spontaneously mentioned, then that response is counted toward the attention score.

Quantitative techniques such as Eye Tracking are used to measure attention and spontaneous response to marketing messages.  Quantitative measurements are based on data and numbers that are gathered from studies based on how people react to the advertisements . Attention data using this methodology can be collected in a variety of simulated environments such as at home or work, as well as across a variety of different screens and devices. In addition to measuring attention, this data can be used by advertisers to optimize the design and placement of advertisements.

Attention Grabbers 
Advertisers like to make people feel things in order to gain their attention. This can be done in a number of ways;

 Association- Using images that you associate with something good or a good feeling.
 Call to action- "Buy today" a way to remove doubt about the next step
 Claim- Letting you know how to products helps you and works
 Color- Different colors are said to bring out different emotions in people. Companies carefully choose the colors they use in their logos and advertisement based on the feeling they want to portray.
 Games and activities- A commercial that is in the form of a game for you to experience in a more fun way. This helps you understand it better.
 Humor- Using ads to make you laugh and so that it will be a funny memory that you remember.
 Hype- Words like amazing and incredible making products seem "hyped"
 Language- Companies use language to get attention. Words that induce humor, fear, excitement are memorable.
 Must-have- A product that you must have and is popular
 Fear- Solving something that you have to worry about like smelly shoes
 Prizes, sweepstakes, and gifts- The chance of winning something for free to attract attention
 Repetition- Repeating your idea or message so that consumers remember it.
 Sales and price- Discounts prices so that a product looks like a better deal
 Sense appeal- Using content that appeals to your 5 senses.
 Size- Larger images will attract attention more than smaller images.
 Special ingredients- Showing that this product works better than others because of this special ingredient.
 Testimonials and endorsements- Using the power of celebrities and their following to grab attention and be convincing.

Measurements 
Eye tracking techniques can be measured by observing the eye movement and pupil dilation when looking at an advertisement.

Terminology
Adcept
Advertising
Awareness
Brand preference
Shockvertising

See also

Advertising research methods
Ad tracking
AttentionTracking
Copy testing

Notes

Further reading
 Banks, Ivana Bušljeta, Patrick De Pelsmacker, and Shintaro Okazaki, eds. Advances in Advertising Research (Vol. V): Extending the Boundaries of Advertising (Springer, 2014)
 Cheng, Hong, ed. The Handbook of International Advertising Research (2014)
Honomichl, J. J. Honomichl on Marketing Research, Lincolnwood, IL: NTC Business Books, 1986.
 Kim, Kyongseok, et al. "Trends in Advertising Research: A Longitudinal Analysis of Leading Advertising, Marketing, and Communication Journals, 1980 to 2010." Journal of advertising 43#3 (2014): 296-316.
Thorson, Esther and Moore, Jeri.  Integrated Communication: Synergy of Persuasive Voices. (Lawrence Erlbaum Associates, Inc., 1996)
 Verlegh, Peeter, Hilde Voorveld, and Martin Eisend, eds. Advances in Advertising Research (Vol. VI): The Digital, the Classic, the Subtle, and the Alternative (Springer, 2015)
Young, Charles E., The Advertising Research Handbook, Ideas in Flight, Seattle, WA, April 2005,

External links
Advertising Educational Foundation, streamed video of Good-Bye Guesswork: How Research Guides Today's Advertisers

Market research
Advertising
Social impact of advertising